Steilacoom may refer to:

People 
 Steilacoom people, an historical Coast Salish tribe who lived near the Puget Sound
 Steilacoom Tribe of Indians, a contemporary heritage group, unrecognized as a tribe

Places 
 Fort Steilacoom, a former US Army outpost near Lake Steilacoom
 Fort Steilacoom Park, the largest park in Lakewood, Washington
 Lake Steilacoom, a lake in Pierce County, Washington, approximately 2.5 miles southwest of Tacoma, Washington
 Steilacoom Creek, an older name for Chambers Creek, in Washington State
 Steilacoom, Washington, a town in Pierce County, Washington
 Colloquially, in Washington State, "Steilacoom" is also used to refer to Western State Hospital, although the hospital is actually in the neighboring city of Lakewood, Washington